Oleksandra Serhiivna Gridasova (born 5 July 1995) is a Ukrainian female rhythmic gymnast. Gridasova competed alongside London 2012 Olympians Olena Dmytrash, Yevgeniya Gomon, Valeriia Gudym, and rookie Anastasiya Voznyak at the 2016 Summer Olympics in Rio de Janeiro, where she and her Ukrainian team placed seventh in the group all-around final with a total score of 34.282.

References

External links 
 

1995 births
Living people
Ukrainian rhythmic gymnasts
Sportspeople from Kharkiv
Gymnasts at the 2016 Summer Olympics
Olympic gymnasts of Ukraine
Universiade medalists in gymnastics
European Games silver medalists for Ukraine
European Games bronze medalists for Ukraine
Universiade gold medalists for Ukraine
Universiade silver medalists for Ukraine
Medalists at the 2013 Summer Universiade
Medalists at the 2015 Summer Universiade
21st-century Ukrainian women